Göksu is a river in Mersin Province, Turkey.

Göksu may also refer to:
 Göksu, Bismil
 Göksu, Karayazı
 Göksu, Mersin, a town in Mersin Province, Turkey
 Göksu Dam, a dam in Diyarbakır Province, Turkey
 Göksu Park, a public park in Ankara, Turkey
 Göksu Waterfall, a waterfall on Göksu river in Kayseri Province, Turkey

People
 Göksu Üçtaş (born 1990), Turkish artistic gymnast
 Yaşam Göksu (born 1995), Turkish women's footballer

Turkish masculine given names
Turkish feminine given names